To Save the City is a 1976 Polish drama film directed by Jan Łomnicki. It was entered into the 10th Moscow International Film Festival.

Cast
 Teresa Budzisz-Krzyżanowska as Jadwiga Nowacka
 Jan Krzyżanowski as Marian Nowacki
 Jacek Miśkiewicz as Janek Nowacki
 Alexander Borisovich Belyavsky as Cpt. Syemyonov (as Aleksander Bielawski)
 Nina Maslova as Masha
 Kirill Arbuzov as Seryozha
 Sergei Polezhayev as Gen. Ivan Konev
 Oleg Mokshantsev as Gen. Ivan Korovnikov
 Jerzy Bączek
 Henryk Bista as Capt. AK 'Sztych'
 Barbara Bosak
 Andrzej Buszewicz as AK soldier
 Marian Cebulski as 'Kania'
 Stanisław Chmieloch as AK soldier 'Malarz'

References

External links
 

1976 films
1976 drama films
1970s Polish-language films
Polish drama films